Claire Laubach (born July 29) is an American field hockey player. At the 2012 Summer Olympics, she competed for the United States women's national field hockey team in the women's event. She was born in Washington Township, New Jersey.

References

External links
 

American female field hockey players
1983 births
Living people
Olympic field hockey players of the United States
Field hockey players at the 2012 Summer Olympics
Field hockey players at the 2011 Pan American Games
Wake Forest Demon Deacons field hockey players
Pan American Games gold medalists for the United States
Pan American Games medalists in field hockey
Medalists at the 2011 Pan American Games